Underhill Center is an unincorporated village and census-designated place (CDP) in the town of Underhill, Chittenden County, Vermont, United States. Underhill Center has a post office with ZIP code 05490, which opened on December 30, 1850.

References

Census-designated places in Chittenden County, Vermont
Census-designated places in Vermont
Unincorporated communities in Chittenden County, Vermont
Unincorporated communities in Vermont